Arvydas Šikšnius (born 10 October 1987) is a Lithuanian professional basketball player, who currently plays for Pieno žvaigždės Pasvalys of the Lithuanian Basketball League.

Professional career
Šikšnius won the Lithuanian Basketball League (LKL) All-Star Game's Slam Dunk Contest, in 2009. He played for nine different LKL teams.

External links
Eurobasket.com Profile
 Website of BBC Bayreuth (German)
 Arvydas Šikšnius BBL.net profile (English)
 Arvydas Šikšnius LKL.lt profile (English and Lithuanian)
 Arvydas Šikšnius moved to BC Perlas (Lithuanian)

1987 births
Living people
BC Rytas players
BC Neptūnas players
BC Nevėžis players
BC Pieno žvaigždės players
BC Prienai players
BC Šiauliai players
Lithuanian men's basketball players
Medi Bayreuth players
Sportspeople from Kretinga
Forwards (basketball)